Ethan Bullemor (born 21 February 2000) is an Australian professional rugby league footballer who plays as a  and  for the Manly Warringah Sea Eagles in the NRL. 

He previously played for the Brisbane Broncos in the National Rugby League.

Background
Bullemor was born in Emerald, Queensland, but was raised in Springsure, Queensland. Bullemor attended St Joseph's College, Nudgee where he achieved an OP 1 and played in the first XV Rugby.

Playing career
Bullemor made his first grade debut in round 2 of the 2020 NRL season for the Brisbane Broncos against South Sydney starting from the bench.

He made a total of 8 appearances for Brisbane in the 2020 NRL season as the club finished last on the table and claimed the wooden spoon.

In round 6 of the 2021 NRL season, Bullemor scored his first top grade try stepping Penrith fullback Stephen Crichton from a linebreak in the 20-12 loss.

In Round 16 of the 2021 NRL season, Bullemor ran for over 100 run metres in a game for the first time in his career as well scoring his 2nd career try in a 26-18 win against Cronulla-Sutherland.
In round 1 of the 2022 NRL season, Bullemor made his club debut for Manly in their 28-6 defeat against Penrith scoring a try.
Bullemor played a total of 12 games for Manly in the 2022 NRL season as the club finished 11th on the table.

References

External links
Brisbane Broncos profile

2000 births
Living people
Australian rugby league players
Brisbane Broncos players
Manly Warringah Sea Eagles players
Norths Devils players
Rugby league players from Queensland
Rugby league props